Modena Volley is a professional volleyball team based in Modena, Italy.  It has played in the highest level of the Italian Volleyball League without interruption since 1968. It is the most successful Italian club, having won the national league twelve times and the national cup as well. The club is one of the most prominent and prestigious in Europe too, having won thirteen European trophies including four CEV Champions League.

Achievements
 CEV Champions League
  (x4) 1990, 1996, 1997, 1998
  (x4) 1987, 1988, 1989, 2003
  (x1) 1991
 CEV Cup
  (x3) 1980, 1986, 1995
  (x1) 2007
 CEV Challenge Cup
  (x5) 1983, 1984, 1985, 2004, 2008
  (x2) 2000, 2001
 CEV SuperCup
  (x1) 1995
  (x2) 1990, 1997
 Italian Championship
  (x12) 1970, 1972, 1974, 1976, 1986, 1987, 1988, 1989, 1995, 1997, 2002, 2016
 Italian Cup
  (x12) 1979, 1980, 1985, 1986, 1988, 1989, 1994, 1995, 1997, 1998, 2015, 2016
 Italian SuperCup
  (x4) 1997, 2015, 2016, 2018

History
The club was founded in 1966 by Benito and Giuseppe Panini, owners of Edizioni Panini publishing house, and was named Gruppo Sportivo Panini (or simply G.S. Panini). The club, trained by Franco Anderlini, started from Serie C (the third level of the Italian League) and achieved the Serie A in 1968, taking only two seasons. Since then it has never been relegated to lower divisions.

It took only another season to achieve the first Italian League, in 1969/70: the victory was led by the Czechoslovak superstar Josef Musil. With Anderlini as head coach Modena won three championships, but in 1975/76 he resigned and was replaced by Polish Edward Skorek who acted as player-coach, leading Panini to another national title. By the end of the 1970s Modena clinched four Italian leagues, two Italian cups and its first European trophy, the 1979/80 CEV Cup Winners' Cup, with the Brazilian Bernard Rajzman and the Italian Francesco Dall'Olio as leaders of the team.

In the 1980s Modena had even greater successes: managed by Julio Velasco the team gained four consecutive Italian leagues and many national and international cups. In 1989 Velasco was appointed head of the Italian national team, leaving Modena where he was replaced by Vladimir Jankovic. Even without Velasco, Modena became European champion winning the 1989/90 CEV Champions League.

The team entered the 1990s with financial difficulties and its best players (Vullo, Bernardi, Bertoli, Cantagalli, Lucchetta) left Modena moving to better funded clubs. The Panini era was coming to an end and in 1993 the club changed ownership for the first time, being taken over by Giovanni Vandelli, a ceramic industrialist who renamed the club as Daytona Volley. Vandelli signed Daniele Bagnoli as head coach and brought back Bertoli, Cantagalli and Vullo.
Modena soon regained its competitiveness and in five seasons it won twelve trophies, including two Italian Leagues and two CEV Champions Leagues. The 1996/97 season could be regarded as one of the most successful in the club's long history, having achieved the Italian League, the Italian Cup and the Champions League in the same year. The line-up of this legendary season was structured by the setter Fabio Vullo, the opposite hitter Juan Cuminetti, the middle-blockers Bas van de Goor and Andrea Giani, the outside hitters Marco Bracci and Luca Cantagalli: one of the best European teams ever.

1996 was also the year of Giuseppe Panini's death, co-founder and for many years the highly respected president of the club. The municipal administration of Modena entitled the local arena, home of the volleyball team, to his memory as Palazzo dello Sport Giuseppe Panini, commonly referred to as PalaPanini by supporters.
In 1997/98, trained by Francesco Dall'Olio, Modena won his third consecutive CEV Champions League.
After an unsuccessful comeback of Daniele Bagnoli, Vandelli's club won its last Italian league in 2001/02 with Angelo Lorenzetti as coach.

Vandelli's last trophy was the 2003/04 CEV Cup (now Challenge Cup), then in 2005 he sold the club to a consortium composed of Antonio Barone (a coal industry businessman and former volleyball player, who won two Italian leagues with the Panini team), Catia Pedrini (Barone's wife) and Giuliano Grani (a merchandising businessman). The name was changed to Pallavolo Modena and Barone became the new president.

During 2008 Barone e Pedrini left the club leaving it in the hands of Grani and new partner Pietro Peia (a long-standing manager of the club). In 2012 even Grani took a step back, leaving Peia as the sole owner. Under the Barone-Grani-Peia ownership Modena won only one trophy with the 2007/08 CEV Challenge Cup, despite great investments to sign notable players like Ángel Dennis, Murilo Endres and Matthew Anderson, and many successive famous coaches like Julio Velasco, Andrea Giani, Silvano Prandi, Daniele Bagnoli (at his third experience at Modena) and Angelo Lorenzetti.

In May 2013 a new consortium composed of Gino Gibertini (dealer of oil products), Antonio Panini (son of Giuseppe Panini), Catia Pedrini, Dino Piacentini (building contractor) and Peter Zehentleitner (CEO of Trenkwalder Italia) acquired the club. Both Gibertini and Piacentini were Panini's players in the seventies. The club's name was changed to Modena Volley Punto Zero with Gibertini as president and Lorenzetti being confirmed as head coach.
The coexistence between many partners proved to be difficult and after few months Gibertini, Panini and Zehentleitner left the consortium. Catia Pedrini was then appointed president of the club with Piacentini in the role of vice-president.

For the 2014–15 season the club's name has been modified to Modena Volley with a new logo.
On 11 January 2015, the team won its first title in 7 years (the last victory was the CEV Challenge Cup in 2008), by defeating Trentino Volley in the final of Italian Volleyball Cup.

For the 2015–2016 season Modena decides to strengthen the team by adding the Brazilian middle-blocker Lucas Saatkamp, and replacing Uroš Kovačević with his Serbian compatriot Miloš Nikić. Since October 2015, the club sets a major sponsorship deal with DHL. During the season, the club enlarged his honours with the victories of Italian Supercup in October and the Italian Volleyball Cup in February, by defeating Trentino Volley in both matches. Above all, the main success of the season has been the Italian national title after 14 years, by defeating SIR Safety Perugia in the final by 3–0.

For the 2016–2017 season, there are many changes: the main sponsor DHL and coach Angelo Lorenzetti leave the club, moreover the Brazilians "magic duo" Bruno Rezende and Lucas Saatkamp return to their home country. Nevertheless, Modena reinforces the roster by hiring two of the best middle blockers in the world: Maxwell Holt and Kevin Le Roux. The expert Argentinian setter Santiago Orduna takes place of Bruninho and the Serbian spiker Nemanja Petric is promoted as team Captain. Since September 2016, the new main sponsor of the club is the Italian asset management company Azimut Holding.

Former names

 Only at CEV Champions Cup
 Only at Italian SuperCup
 Since 28 February 2015

Team
Team roster – season 2022/2023

Notable players
The stars indicate Volleyball Hall of Fame inductees.

Presidents

Head coaches

 In November 1996 Daniele Bagnoli suffered serious injuries from a car accident and was replaced by Bertoli until his recovery.
 In February 2000 Bruno Bagnoli was sacked and replaced by Bertoli.
 In January 2004 Lorenzetti was dismissed and replaced by the assistant coach Menarini.
 In December 2008 Giani was sacked and replaced by Zanini.
 In January 2011 Prandi was dismissed and replaced by Daniele Bagnoli.
 In February 2017 Piazza and the club agreed to terminate the contract. He was replaced by the assistant coach Tubertini.

Kit manufacturer
The table below shows the history of kit providers for the Modena team.

References

External links
 Official website
 Team profile at Volleybox.net

Italian volleyball clubs
Modena
Volleyball clubs established in 1966
Sport in Emilia-Romagna